Hogbacks are stone carved Anglo-Scandinavian sculptures from 10th- to 12th-century England and Scotland. Singular hogbacks were found in Ireland and Wales. Hogbacks fell out of fashion by the beginning of the 11th century. Their function is generally accepted as grave markers. Similar grave markers have been found in Scandinavia. In Cornwall similar stones are known as coped stones.

Geography and description
Hogbacks take the form of recumbent monuments, generally with a curved ('hogbacked') ridge, often also with outwardly curved sides. This shape, and the fact that they are frequently decorated with 'shingles' on either side of the central ridge, show that they are stylised 'houses' for the dead. The 'house' is of a Scandinavian longhouse type associated with the 'mead hall' feasting at Valhalla in pre-Christian Norse religion. One theory is that hogbacks originated among the Danish settlers who emigrated to northern England in the 870s. However, there is not sufficient research to prove or disprove this.

It has been suggested that the monument-type was invented about 920. There are particular concentrations of hogbacks in Yorkshire, Cumbria, and Govan on the River Clyde – the first being their likely area of origin. Individual examples are found over a much wider area, however, from Derbyshire to Central Scotland.  The presence of hogbacks in Scotland is likely due to the Forth-Clyde route, which connected York, England to Dublin. Most hogback sites in Scotland are along maritime routes.

English hogback sites do not follow this same trajectory. There are stray examples as far afield as the Northern Isles and Orkney. Ireland has a single example at Castledermot, County Kildare, which is similar to two hogbacks in Ingleby Arncliffe, North Yorkshire. Wales also has a single example at Llanddewi Aberarth Church.

The most numerous collections are the ones preserved in St Thomas's church at Brompton, North Yorkshire. Discovered in 1867 following the restoration of the church, six were taken to Durham Cathedral Library, leaving four whole ones and fragments of others at Brompton. They are characterized by carvings of bears hugging the slabs with strapwork in their mouths. Elsewhere, five impressive examples found in the early medieval churchyard of Govan Old are in the Govan Stones museum, situated in the (former) parish kirk of Govan, Glasgow. There is a fine example in the visitor centre on Inchcolm island in the Firth of Forth. An excellent and highly decorated example exists in St. Peter's Church Heysham near Morecambe.

Typology

There are two main types of hogbacks. One is the Brompton type, which is characterized by massive end beasts. The other type is the warrior's tomb, which looks more like a house. It does not have massive end beasts.  Within the two main groups of hogback styles are smaller subsets. The scroll type hogback is a subset of the warrior's tomb type. It is characterized by scroll motifs on the horizontal band below the tegulation.

Hogbacks at Govan

Govan sits on the south bank of the Clyde River. It has the four largest known hogbacks. There are five hogbacks at Govan Parish Church. The earliest has been dated to the mid-tenth century. It has two rows of tegulation with concave, contoured lines. It has a band of interlace beneath the rows of shingles. The interlace pattern is not the same on either side. It is not continuous on either side. This is the only hogback at Govan with stopped-plait interlacing. The stopped plait on this hogback is characterized by a series of small, separated elements with pellet fillers. It also has a running ring-knot interlace with frets. On the other side, the sections of four-cord plait are stylistically reduced to a contoured diagonal bar crossed with a bar and four small pellets flanking it.

The later four hogbacks at Govan are dated to the end of the 10th century. The longest hogback at Govan does not have the decorative motifs that its earlier brother has. It is covered in rows of shingles, but they are not contoured. It is wider with a shallower roof pitch. The third hogback is massive. It has a full-bodied, 3-dimensional end-beast with legs. This single animal straddles the monument from one end to the other. The fourth hogback is also characterized by a single end-beast. Its head faces outward, an uncommon feature in hogbacks. The animal's four bent legs point toward its head. The roof ridges resemble a spine and the rows of tegulation are like scales. The fifth hogback has two end-beasts, one at either end. The beasts' faces and bodies are shown in profile with jaws gaping open, their legs intersecting along the base. This is the only known hogback with end-beasts in this position.

Coped stones

In Cornwall grave markers of the hogback type are known as coped stones. There are five known coped stones surviving, varying in their resemblance to hogbacks found elsewhere. One is found in St Buryan, another in Lanivet a third at Phillack, a fourth at St Tudy and in 2012 a fifth was excavated in Padstow. Cornish coped stones tend to be longer than normal hogbacks at over 2 metres in length, but shorter in height, and have an unusual hipped roof style. The Lanivet stone is the only known hogback in Cornwall to have beasts carved on the ends. The stones show both Scandinavian and local Cornish influence in their designs, indicating the inclusion of Cornwall in a "western British Viking-age sculptural tradition".

See also

Anglo-Saxon art#Monumental sculpture and wall painting
The Botkyrka monument 
Eskilstuna cist 
Lily stone 
Västergötland Runic Inscription 81

Footnotes

Further reading
 Bailey, R. N. (1980). Viking Age Sculpture in Northern England, London: Collins Archaeology .
 Batey, Colleen E. "Hogback Gravestones at Govan and Beyond." Scottish Archaeological Journal 25, no. 1 (March 2003): 96–97. Academic Search Complete, EBSCOhost.
 Campbell, Ewan. 2004. "Early Medieval Sculpture in the West Highlands and Islands." Scottish Historical Review 83, 1, no. 215: 86–87. Academic Search Complete, EBSCOhost.
 Cramp, Rosemary. "Conclusion from the Govan Conference". Govan and its Early Medieval Sculpture (1994): 135–136.
 Crawford, Barbara E. "Vikings in Scotland". Scottish Archaeological Journal 25, no. 1 (March 2003): 91–94. Academic Search Complete, EBSCOhost.
 Crawford, Barbara E. "The 'Norse Background' to the Govan Hogbacks." Govan and its Early Medieval Sculpture (1994): 103–112.
 
 Lang, James T. "The Govan Hogbacks: A Re-appraisal." Govan and its Early Medieval Sculpture (1994): 123–132.
 .
 Lang, James T. "Hogback monuments in Scotland." In Proceedings of the Society of Antiquaries of Scotland, vol. 105, 1972, pp. 206–235.
 Lang, James T. (1984). "The Hogback: a Viking colonial monument", Anglo-Saxon Studies; 3, Oxford.
 Lang, James T. Corpus of Anglo-Saxon Stone Sculpture. Oxford: Published for the British Academy by Oxford University Press, 2001.
 .
Poole, Russell. Review of Cultures in Contact: Scandinavian Settlement in England in the Ninth and Tenth Centuries, by Dawn M. Hadley Julian D. Richards. The Journal of English and Germanic Philology, Vol. 102, No. 1 (January 2003): pp. 136–138.
 Richards, J. D. (2000). Viking Age England, Stroud: Tempus .
 Ritchie, Anna (ed.) (1994). Govan and its Early Medieval Sculpture, Stroud: Alan Sutton .
 Thomas, Charles. “Christianity at Govan.” Govan and its Early Medieval Sculpture (1994): 20–25.

External links

Brompton Church; hogbacks
Third Stone; hogbacks

England in the High Middle Ages
Culture of medieval Scotland
Scandinavian Scotland
Germanic archaeological artifacts
Picture stones
Types of monuments and memorials
Viking art
Outdoor sculptures in England
Outdoor sculptures in Scotland
Burial monuments and structures
Medieval European sculptures
Stone sculptures in the United Kingdom